Alan Trouten (born 8 November 1985) is a Scottish footballer who plays as a midfielder or forward for Scottish League Two club East Fife. During his career spent mainly in the second and third levels of the Scottish football league system, Trouten has played for Greenock Morton, Queen's Park, Clyde, Airdrie United, and Albion Rovers, as well as having two spells at both Ayr United and Brechin City.

Career
Born in Rutherglen, Trouten began his career with Greenock Morton, but failed to make an appearance with them and joined Queen's Park. During his time at Queen's Park, he won the Scottish Football League Young Player of the Month award in February 2005, and was in the Spiders''' squad which eliminated SPL club Aberdeen from the 2006–07 Scottish League Cup, scoring the clinching kick in the penalty shoot-out.

He joined Scottish First Division club Clyde on 2 June 2008. He made a dream start to his Clyde career in July 2008, scoring both goals in a 2–0 victory over Annan Athletic in the Scottish Challenge Cup. Trouten's contract was terminated in June 2009, following Clyde's relegation and financial troubles.

Trouten made a guest appearance for Shamrock Rovers in a friendly against Newcastle United on 11 July 2009 at Tallaght Stadium. On 22 July 2009, it was announced that Trouten had signed for Airdrie United. He was released along with the full Airdrie squad after their relegation in the 2009–10 season, and then subsequently signed a one-year-deal with Ayr United.

Trouten signed for Brechin City at the start of the 2012–13 season. At the end of the season, he was voted into the Second Division Team of the Year. Ahead of the 2015–16 season, he re-signed for former club Ayr United. He was released after one season with the Honest Men. In June 2016, Trouten returned to Brechin City, playing with the club for the 2016–17 season before leaving on 30 May 2017.

After leaving Glebe Park, Trouten signed for Scottish League One side Albion Rovers on 6 June 2017. He quickly endeared himself to his new supporters by scoring seven goals in four games during the early-season 2017–18 Scottish League Cup group stage, including a hat-trick in a 4–4 draw with top-tier Hamilton Academical and the winning penalty in the resulting shootout, although it was not enough for the Wee Rovers to advance in the competition. By January 2018, his tally was 24 goals in 24 games, making him the nation's leading goalscorer (alongside Rory McAllister, a dedicated striker). By the end of the season he had scored 28 in all competitions, but Albion Rovers were relegated having finished bottom of Scottish League One.

With Trouten out of contract at Rovers, he joined Alloa Athletic in the summer of 2018. At the start of his fourth season with the Wasps'' (now relegated to the third tier after three seasons in the Championship), 35-year-old Trouten was again involved in a win over Premiership opposition, this time scoring the winning goal via a penalty against Livingston in the 2021–22 Scottish League Cup group stage.

Career statistics

References

External links

Living people
Scottish footballers
Queen's Park F.C. players
Clyde F.C. players
Airdrieonians F.C. players
Scottish Football League players
Shamrock Rovers F.C. guest players
1985 births
Greenock Morton F.C. players
Ayr United F.C. players
Brechin City F.C. players
Albion Rovers F.C. players
Alloa Athletic F.C. players
Scottish Professional Football League players
Sportspeople from Rutherglen
People educated at Stonelaw High School
Association football forwards
Association football midfielders
Footballers from South Lanarkshire